"Klänge der Heimat" ("Sounds of my homeland"), also called "Csárdás", is an aria for soprano from act 2 of the operetta Die Fledermaus by Johann Strauss II. It appears in many anthologies of music for soprano singers, and is frequently performed in recitals.

It is sung by Rosalinde, disguised as a masked Hungarian Countess, at Prince Orlofsky's party.

A csárdás is a traditional Hungarian dance, which usually begins with a slow introduction and continues with a fast, lively section.

References

External links
 , Ljuba Welitsch

Compositions by Johann Strauss II
Arias in German
Opera excerpts
1874 compositions
Soprano arias